Renée Gary was a French film editor active in the 1940s through the early 1960s. She worked on several films by Maurice Cloche.

Selected filmography 

 The Spy Catcher (1960)
 Ciné ballets de Paris (1959)
 Nuits andalouses (1954)
 Rayés des vivants (1952)
 Domenica (1952)
 Born of Unknown Father (1950)
 La portatrice di pane (1950)
 Mademoiselle de la Ferté (1949)
 Docteur Laennec (1949)
 Coeur de coq (1946)
 Women's Games (1946)

References

External links 

 

French women film editors
French film editors
Year of birth missing
Year of death missing